Briggsdale may refer to:

Briggsdale, Columbus, Ohio, a neighborhood of Columbus
Briggsdale, Colorado, an unincorporated community